The men's football tournament at the 2020 Summer Olympics was the international football tournament in Japan from 22 July to 7 August 2021. The sixteen participating national teams were required to submit squads of 18 players – of which two have to be goalkeepers – by 30 June 2021, 23 days prior to the opening match of the tournament.  Additionally, teams could name a maximum of four alternate players, numbered from 19 to 22. The alternate list could contain at most three outfielders, as at least one slot was reserved for a goalkeeper. In the event that a player on the submitted squad list suffered an injury or illness, that player would have been able to be replaced by one of the players in the alternate list. Only players in these squads were planned to be eligible to take part in the tournament. On 2 July, FIFA confirmed that there was a change for the 2020 Olympics, allowing all 22 players named to be available on the roster, with 18 being named for each match. This change was implemented due to the challenges of the COVID-19 pandemic. The official squad lists were released by FIFA on 7 July 2021.

The age listed for each player is on 22 July 2021, the first day of the tournament. The numbers of caps and goals listed for each player do not include any matches played after the start of the tournament. The club listed is the club for which the player last played a competitive match prior to the tournament. The nationality for each club reflects the national association (not the league) to which the club is affiliated. A flag is included for coaches who are of a different nationality than their own national team.

Group A

France
France's initial final squad was announced on 25 June 2021. However, after several clubs refused to release their players, a new squad was announced on 2 July 2021, along with additional players to complete the final roster. Before the start of the tournament, Niels Nkounkou was called up to replace the injured Jérémy Gelin.

Head coach: Sylvain Ripoll

* Overage player.

Japan
Japan's final squad was announced on 22 June 2021.

Head coach: Hajime Moriyasu

* Overage player

Mexico
Mexico's 22-man final squad was announced on 15 June 2021. On July 4th, José Juan Macías withdrew due to injury and was replaced by Adrián Mora.

Head coach: Jaime Lozano

* Overage player.

South Africa
South Africa's final squad was announced on 3 July 2021.

Head coach: David Notoane

* Overage player.

Group B

Honduras
Honduras' final squad was announced on 2 July 2021.

Head coach:  Miguel Falero

* Overage player.

New Zealand
New Zealand's 18-man squad was announced on 25 June 2021. As well as the reserves players named, Tim Payne was named as a replacement in the event that Winston Reid didn't receive a release to travel. On 2 July 2021, Reid was confirmed as available for selection. 

Head coach: Danny Hay

* Overage player.

Romania
Romania's initial 22-man squad was announced on 1 July 2021. On 9 July, Dragoș Nedelcu, who was set to complete a loan move to Fortuna Düsseldorf, withdrew from the squad at the request of the club and replaced by Ronaldo Deaconu.

Head coach: Mirel Rădoi

 

* Overage player.

South Korea
South Korea's final squad was announced on 2 July 2021.

Head coach: Kim Hak-bum

* Overage player.

Group C

Argentina
Argentina's final squad was announced on 1 July 2021.

Head coach: Fernando Batista

* Overage player.

Australia
Australia's squad was named on 29 June 2021. On 5 July 2021, it was announced that Marco Tilio replaced Ramy Najjarine and Jay Rich-Baghuelou replaced Ruon Tongyik.

Head coach: Graham Arnold

* Overage player.

Egypt
Egypt's 22-man final squad was announced on 2 July 2021.

Head coach: Shawky Gharieb

* Overage player.

Spain
Spain's 60-man preliminary squad was announced on 5 June 2021. The 22-man squad was announced on 29 June 2021, with Iván Villar replacing the injured Álex Domínguez.

Head coach: Luis de la Fuente

* Overage player.

Group D

Brazil
Brazil's 50-man preliminary squad was announced on 15 June 2021. The 18-man squad was announced on 17 June. However, after several clubs refused to release their players, a new squad was announced on 2 July 2021, along with four additional players to complete the final roster of 22. On 8 July, Ricardo Graça replaced Gabriel Magalhães who withdrew injured. On 14 July, Malcom replaced Douglas Augusto who withdrew injured.

Head coach: André Jardine

* Overage player.

Germany
Germany's final squad was announced on 4 July 2021. Ragnar Ache and Keven Schlotterbeck were nominated five days later, after Josha Vagnoman and Niklas Dorsch withdrew.

Head coach: Stefan Kuntz

* Overage player.

Ivory Coast
Ivory Coast's final squad was announced on 3 July 2021.

Head coach: Soualiho Haïdara

* Overage player.

Saudi Arabia
Saudi Arabia's 24-man preliminary squad was announced on 16 June 2021. The final squad was announced on 6 July 2021. Turki Al-Ammar withdrew injured and was replaced by Firas Al-Buraikan on 21 July.

Head coach: Saad Al-Shehri

* Overage player.

Footnotes

References

External links
Men's Olympic Football Tournament Tokyo 2020, FIFA.com

2020 Summer Olympics Men's
squads
Football Men's